Marco Zipoli (born 16 June 1990 in Genoa) is an Italian racing driver. He has competed in such series as the Italian Formula Three Championship and was runner-up in 2009.  He trialled for the Ferrari Formula One team in 2009.

References

External links
 

1990 births
Living people
Sportspeople from Genoa
Italian racing drivers
Italian Formula Three Championship drivers

BVM Target drivers